Brent Jeffers is an American football coach.  He served as the head football coach at Southwest State University—now known as Southwest Minnesota State University—in Marshall, Minnesota, for four seasons, from 1993 to 1996, compiling a record of 12–29.

Head coaching record

References

Year of birth missing (living people)
Living people
Southwest Minnesota State Mustangs football coaches